Yernar Yerimbetov (born February 15, 1980, in Almaty) is a Kazakhstani gymnast. Yerimbetov trained under the old Soviet system until the USSR dissolved. He first competed internationally at age 17, in the 1997 Junior International. He finished 24th All Around (AA) with a 46.650. At the 2001 World Artistic Gymnastics Championships, he made finals on Floor and Vault, finishing in 6th place. He also made finals on Floor and Vault, finishing out of the medals.

Yerimbetov competed in many competitions during 2002 and 2003. He won a gold medal on HB at the Grand Prix at Ghent, Belgium in 2005. He also won gold at the 2003 University Games and Asian Championships. At the 2003 World Artistic Gymnastics Championships, he placed 4th AA. Yerimbetov qualified for the 2004 Summer Olympics but placed 14th in the Men's individual all-around after placing fifth in Men's artistic qualification. In the parallel bars competition, he finished eighth. In 2006, Yerimbetov won a bronze medal on vault at the 2006 Asian Games, and competed at the Grand Prix Final on vault.

Yernar has a wife and son in Almaty, Kazakhstan.

References

External links 
 
 
 

1980 births
Living people
Sportspeople from Almaty
Kazakhstani male artistic gymnasts
Gymnasts at the 2004 Summer Olympics
Asian Games medalists in gymnastics
Gymnasts at the 2002 Asian Games
Gymnasts at the 2006 Asian Games
Gymnasts at the 2010 Asian Games
Asian Games bronze medalists for Kazakhstan
Medalists at the 2006 Asian Games
Universiade medalists in gymnastics
Universiade gold medalists for Kazakhstan
Universiade silver medalists for Kazakhstan
Olympic gymnasts of Kazakhstan
Medalists at the 2003 Summer Universiade
Medalists at the 2005 Summer Universiade
21st-century Kazakhstani people